The Canggal inscription is a Sanskrit inscription dated to 732, discovered in the Gunung Wukir temple complex in Kadiluwih village, Salam, Magelang Regency, Central Java, Indonesia. The inscription is written in the Pallava alphabet. The inscription documents an edict of Sanjaya, in which he declared himself the universal ruler of Mataram Kingdom.

Content 
The inscription describes the erection of a lingam (the symbol of Shiva) on the country of Kunjarakunja, by Sanjaya's order. The lingam is sited on the noble island of Yava (Java), which the inscription describes as "rich in grain and gold mines". Yawadwipa ("Java island"), and had long been under the rule of the wise and virtuous king Sanna, but fell into disunity after his death. Amid a period of confusion Sanjaya, son of Sannaha (the sister of Sanna) ascended to the throne. Sanjaya mastered holy scriptures, martial arts, and displayed military prowess. After the conquest of neighboring areas his reign was peaceful and prosperous.

The inscription makes reference to Kunjarakunja-desa, perhaps meaning "the hermitage land of Kunjara", which has been identified as the hermitage of Rishi Agastya, a Hindu Maharishi revered in Southern India. The Ramayana contains a reference to a visit to Agastya hermitage on Kunjara by Rama, Sita, and Lakshmana.

The name Sanjaya, Sanna and Sannaha curiously was also mentioned in Carita Parahyangan, a book from later period composed around 16th century which suggested refer to same historical person.

See also
Sojomerto inscription (c. 725)
Kalasan inscription (778)
Kelurak inscription (782)
Karangtengah inscription (824)
Mantyasih inscription (907)
Laguna Copperplate Inscription (900)
Tri Tepusan inscription (842)
Shivagrha inscription (856)
Hinduism in Indonesia
Hinduism in Java
Pararaton (Book of Kings)
Indonesian Esoteric Buddhism
Kedu Plain

Notes

References
 Damais, L.C., 1952, 'Etudes d'épigraphie indonésienne, III, Liste des principales inscriptions datées de 1'Indonésie', Bulletin de l'École Française d'Extrême-Orient (Hanoi) XLVI: 1-103.
 Dowson, J., 1957, A classical dictionary of Hindu mythology. London: Kegan Paul.
 H. Kern, 1917, Verspreide Geschriften, deel VII. 's-Gravenhage: Nijhoff.
 J.J. Ras, 1994, ‘Geschiedschrijving en de Legitimateit van het Koningschap op Java' BKI 150-3 (1994): 518-38.

External links 
 drawing of Canggal inscription

Mataram Kingdom
Sanskrit inscriptions in Indonesia
8th-century inscriptions
732
National Museum of Indonesia